Downtown Columbia Historic District may refer to:

 Downtown Columbia Historic District (Columbia, Louisiana), listed on the NRHP in Louisiana
 Downtown Columbia Historic District (Columbia, Mississippi), listed on the NRHP in Mississippi
 Downtown Columbia, Missouri, which includes a Downtown Columbia Historic District listed on the NRHP in Missouri

See also
Columbia Historic District (disambiguation)